The Metro Tunnel (previously known during planning as the Melbourne Metro Rail Project) is a metropolitan rail infrastructure project currently under construction in Melbourne, Australia. It includes the construction of twin  rail tunnels between South Kensington (north west of the Melbourne central business district) and South Yarra (in the south east) with five new underground stations. The tunnel will connect the Pakenham and Cranbourne lines with the Sunbury line, creating a new cross-city line that bypasses Flinders Street station and the City Loop. From 2029 the line will also serve Melbourne Airport via a new branch line west of Sunshine station.

The project will allow for the operational separation of various existing lines on Melbourne's rail network and increase the capacity of the system to allow for metro-style frequencies. The Metro Tunnel project includes the installation of high-capacity signalling and platform-screen doors. With the delivery of other associated projects including accessibility upgrades, the introduction of High Capacity Metro Trains, and the removal of all level crossing across the Pakenham, Cranbourne and Sunbury lines, will allow the corridor to run to rapid transit standards.

The State government began planning in 2015 and enabling works commenced in early 2017. Sections of the Melbourne central business district, including City Square and parts of Swanston Street, were closed to enable construction of the tunnel and stations. Tunnelling began in 2019 and was completed in 2021. The project was originally expected to be completed in 2026, but has now been brought forward to 2025. The project is being delivered by Rail Projects Victoria, formerly the Melbourne Metro Rail Authority, at an estimated cost of $9 to $11 billion.

Background 

Melbourne's original development occurred at a time when railway technology began to emerge as a feasible and efficient mode of transit. This led to a symbiotic relationship between the CBD and the rail network which grew to surround it. An almost purely radial system of lines, developed largely before 1930, linked the growing suburbs to the economic hub of the city centre, producing a system which supported the daily flow of passengers into and out of the city to access employment opportunities. Despite the increasingly car-oriented developments of the mid-20th century, the suburban rail lines in Melbourne continued to discourage any decentralisation of employment, leaving the city unusually dependent on its central core when compared to cities of similar size globally.

The first underground rail line to be built in Melbourne was the City Loop, which began construction in 1971 and opened gradually between 1981 and 1985. Among its aims were to reduce pressure on Flinders Street station by distributing passengers to three additional stations in the city centre (Parliament, Melbourne Central, Flagstaff), and to improve the capacity of the networks central core by eliminating the need for trains to change direction after terminating at Flinders Street. However, it was not entirely successful in achieving these aims. The four tunnels of the Loop proved to be a capacity constraint on the ten main railway lines entering the CBD, and the peculiarities of operating four single-direction balloon loops meant that inner-city rapid transit was difficult for passengers. At the same time, the Loop consumed much of the available capital available for investment in the city's rail system. As a result, the extensions to the outer suburban network which had been envisaged as a succession to the Loop itself did not eventuate. Meanwhile, patronage on the network had entered a long period of decline, which culminated in the Lonie Report of 1980 recommending the closure of several lines.

The need for an overhaul of the existing commuter rail network was first discussed in the early 2000s as unprecedented population growth began to place significant pressure on existing rail infrastructure and constraints on the inner core of the network as it approached capacity. Other problems faced by the network in the first decade of the 21st century included inefficient operations which had developed during years of low patronage, and a loss of corporate memory, caused in part by the privatisation of rail services in the late 1990s, which limited the flexibility of planners in dealing with the burgeoning passenger numbers. Consequently, a large number of services were experiencing major overcrowding in peak periods. A series of planning documents released during the early 2000s, including Melbourne 2030 (2002), Linking Melbourne (2004) and Meeting Our Transport Challenges (2006) identified that significant capacity constraints existed in the central core and on the Dandenong corridor, but did not propose any significant capital works in the city centre, instead suggesting that the issues could be resolved by relatively minor operational changes and construction of a third track to Dandenong.

Outside the state government, support grew for a more substantial augmentation of the rail network, with many such ideas based on new underground lines through the CBD. In 2005, The Age reported that it had received a number of proposals from planning experts and engineers for rail "loops and arcs" in the central city, and publicised a plan published by Monash University professor Graham Currie for a tunnel between the University of Melbourne to the north of the city and South Yarra station to the south-east. Currie's plan also envisaged extensive improvements to the Melbourne tram network, including upgrading lines along St Kilda Road and Chapel Street to light rail standards. In 2006, the state government considered a plan to construct a combined road and rail tunnel beneath the Yarra River to provide an alternative to the West Gate Bridge, but the idea was deemed unfeasible.

By 2007, the planned third track to Dandenong was effectively abandoned, with no money provided for the project in that year's state budget, and opposition growing from the Public Transport Users Association and others. Later that year, it emerged that train operator Connex and coordinating authority Metlink were among stakeholders encouraging the government to consider a proposal similar to Currie's, but extended to Footscray in the city's west. Melbourne City Council, on the other hand, proposed a tunnel conceptually similar to the Currie plan, but running from Jewell station in the north to Windsor in the south-east.

History

Early planning
In 2008, transport planner Sir Rod Eddington handed down the findings of a report into Melbourne's east–west transport needs, following a commission by the Brumby Government. The Eddington Report recommended two key projects in the city centre: an East West Link road tunnel providing an alternative cross-town route to the West Gate Bridge, and a  rail tunnel from Footscray to Caulfield via the CBD. According to Eddington, the tunnel would increase the capacity of the central rail network by removing some trains from the City Loop, allowing future extensions to the suburban lines. In December that year, the project was incorporated into the government's Victorian Transport Plan, to be built in two stages: the first from Footscray to St Kilda Road, and the second along the rest of the route.

Following the 2010 Victorian election, the newly elected Baillieu Government abandoned the Brumby transport plan, and announced that each of the projects would be individually reviewed, some by the newly created Public Transport Development Authority. Then, in its 2012 budget, the government announced a revised version of the tunnel plan: a "Melbourne Metro" from South Kensington to South Yarra along a similar city centre route to Eddington's original proposal. The revised project included five underground stations, and was submitted to Infrastructure Australia where it was deemed "ready to proceed" and was listed as the highest-priority infrastructure project in Melbourne. A business case was quickly developed based on the constraints of the existing rail system, which was rapidly approaching its maximum capacity. The Department of Transport commenced geotechnical drillings and route investigations.

A dispute between the federal and state government over the funding for the tunnel intensified in 2013, with the approach of that year's federal election. The state budget in early May revealed that none of the $50 million in planning money allocated the previous year had been spent, with new premier Denis Napthine deferring the project in favour of the East West Link. Despite this, with the release of the 2013 federal budget a week later, the government Gillard government committed $3 billion to the project on the condition that the state match the contribution. The remaining money was to be raised by a public-private partnership, with the possibility that the contractor could take over running of the line in addition to its construction. However, federal opposition leader Tony Abbott declared that if he was elected in the 2013 federal election, no Commonwealth money would be spent on urban passenger rail, and that any commitment to the Melbourne Metro tunnel project would be revoked.

Meanwhile, Public Transport Victoria's Network Development Plan Metropolitan Rail (NDPMR), released in early 2013, identified the Metro Tunnel as the centrepiece of a 20-year strategy for improving the Melbourne suburban rail network. The then CEO of Public Transport Victoria Ian Dobbs argued that any expansion of the system was "impossible" without vastly improved capacity in the core of the network. The NDPMR envisaged the tunnel's construction taking place from 2017 to 2022, enabling the segregation of the rail system into four independently operated lines, each with their own routes through the CBD. It also outlined a service plan for the tunnel, proposing an initial peak hour flow of 8 trains per hour in each direction.

Alternate route 
In February the following year, the state government announced that it was considering alternative alignments for the tunnel, because of concerns that cut and cover construction in Swanston Street would result in a massive disruption to traffic and retail activity for an extended period of time. At the launch of its 2014 budget, the Napthine government announced that the Metro Tunnel project would be abandoned and replaced with an alternative proposal called the "Melbourne Rail Link". The MRL route consisted of a tunnel from South Yarra to Southern Cross via Kings Domain and Fishermans Bend, where it would join existing City Loop tunnels reconfigured for bidirectional traffic. Furthermore, the government promised that the realignment would enable a Melbourne Airport rail link to be constructed from Southern Cross at the same time. Ultimately, the reconfiguration of the rail network was to have produced similar operational outcomes as the Melbourne Metro plan, with a Sunbury-Dandenong corridor operating directly between Southern Cross and Flinders Street in both directions, but with an additional end-to-end line from Frankston to Ringwood via the new tracks.

According to government ministers, the Melbourne Rail Link offered greater capacity increases and less disruption during the construction phase than existing plans. However, it was heavily criticised, including by Lord Mayor of Melbourne Robert Doyle, who described the route change as a potential "100-year catastrophe" because of its failure to service the Parkville medical and research precinct. Furthermore, the government revealed in the days following the budget that it had not produced a business case for its plan, and that the decision had been taken primarily on the basis of a "common sense" need to service its urban redevelopment project at Fishermans Bend. Other concerns emerged in the months following the budget, with experts publicly questioning whether the Napthine government had committed sufficient funding, and whether the proposed tunnels could be engineered to successfully avoid the main Melbourne sewer.

Andrews government proposal 

By November, with the state election approaching, the rail tunnel had become a major point of contention in the campaign, with the government prioritising the East West Link (EWL) road tunnel rather than the rail tunnel. Then Labor opposition Daniel Andrews promised that "under no circumstances" would it build the EWL if elected. As an alternative, Labor proposed reinstating the original Metro Tunnel plan, which retained the support of senior public servants in the Department of Transport, Planning and Local Infrastructure. According to their analysis, the original tunnel route performed substantially better than the EWL in a cost-benefits analysis, but no such calculation had been performed for the new Melbourne Rail Link.

On the eve of the election, it emerged that the Abbott federal government had redirected $3 billion in funding to the EWL, and that they would refuse to allow it to be used for the Melbourne Metro project. A Labor state government under Premier Daniel Andrews was elected the following day, and immediately set about cancelling contracts for the EWL. At the same time however, new Treasurer Tim Pallas conceded that it would be "difficult" to deliver the Metro Tunnel given the complexities of the funding dispute.

In February 2015, the Andrews government announced $40 million in immediate funding to establish the Melbourne Metro Rail Authority, in order to commence detailed planning work along the original route, and promised a further $300 million in its upcoming budget. It also revealed that a $3 billion line of credit originally established to fund the EWL would be redirected to the Melbourne Metro project. A timeline was provided, with construction expected to commence in 2018 and the tunnel to be open in 2026. Meanwhile, the federal government continued to refuse to fund the project, which led some observers to describe Andrews' commitment as a "significant political risk".

Funding

On 15 April 2015 the government announced that the MMRA had selected a route along Swanston Street as the preferred alignment for the project. The announcement revealed that routes under Elizabeth Street and Russell Street had been considered but were rejected on the basis of engineering difficulties and lack of connectivity respectively. The announcement was criticised by representatives of city retailers, who claimed that the disruption would cause damage to their businesses. The government acknowledged massive changes to city access but assured retailers they would be treated fairly. Further concerns about the proposed route emerged when it emerged that the tunnel would not connect to South Yarra station and that the Pakenham and Cranbourne services would bypass the station entirely once the tunnel opened.

Discussions about the funding of the project continued into late April. The state government acknowledged that the Abbott federal government would not make any contribution to the project, but stated that it remained "hopeful" a future federal government would change the policy. Towards the end of the month, the Andrews government announced that $1.5 billion would be allocated in the upcoming state Budget for the full cost of pre-construction works, land and property acquisition, and detailed route investigations, on top of the already announced money for planning. Among the work funded was the drilling of 140 bore holes to establish ground conditions along the route. However, questions remained about the state government's capacity to fund the remainder of the project, and it was reported that no business case had been completed, despite this being Labor's key objection to the Melbourne Rail Link plan when in opposition. A levy on land tax for commercial properties benefiting from the tunnel, similar to that used on the City Loop and on the contemporary London Crossrail project, was proposed as one possible solution. At the same time the funding announcement was made, the MMRA announced it had appointed technical and planning advisors for the project.

Detailed planning 
After the state Budget in May, details gradually emerged of the revised business case for the tunnel, including specific routes and tunnel options. The government ruled out an interchange to the existing railway station at South Yarra because of its expense, a move criticised by opposition parties and public transport advocates. Investigative drilling along Swanston Street began in early June, with the government announcing later in June that negotiations with the financiers of the cancelled EWL had concluded, enabling the $3 billion credit facility to be redirected to the Metro Tunnel. In August, tunnel boring machines were announced as the preferred engineering option for the sections of the project under the Yarra River. The September federal Liberal leadership spill, which saw Malcolm Turnbull replace Abbott as prime minister, led to new hope for federal funding of the project when Turnbull announced he would consider all transport projects on their merits through Infrastructure Australia.

In October 2015, the government announced it had abandoned earlier plans to run the tunnel 10 metres beneath Swanston Street and above the existing City Loop tunnels and instead place parts of the project  underground between CBD North and CBD South stations. The decision was made to reduce the disruption to trams services and traders along Swanston Street and to avoid removing critical utilities, such as telecommunication lines, from beneath the street. The cost of the change was disputed, with the government claiming the additional tunnelling expense would be met by the savings of services remaining in place, but opposition parties arguing the change could be up to $1 billion more expensive.

With the key engineering details in place, the scope of the project and its associated disruptions gradually became public. The government first announced in October it would compulsorily acquire the properties of 63 households and 31 businesses at several locations on the tunnel route. Later, in November, road closures for up to five years were announced near construction sites, and specific station designs were released for the first time. The first package of works, a $300 million contract for site preparation and services relocation, was opened for tenders by MMRA on 25 November.

In February 2016, the full business case for the project was released which detailed its design. Early that year, geotechnical drilling was extended to the Yarra River, as political arguments continued over the Metro Tunnel's funding arrangements. Having selected a public-private partnership model based on long-term maintenance and commercial opportunities for investment, and with a new business case released publicly, the state government continued to request a significant federal contribution, but the Turnbull government said it would not consider the project until it had been independently analysed by Infrastructure Australia. Despite the ongoing dispute, a shortlist of bidders was announced in late February for the early works package, and the construction timeline continued to suggest a 2016 start to works.

In the 2016 state budget, Premier Daniel Andrews and his Treasurer Tim Pallas declared that the state would bear the entire cost of the project in lieu of federal funds, using a combination of increased revenues from a strong property market, and an increase to the states net debt over the following decade. The federal budget released in 2016 did however include $857 million redirected from other infrastructure projects to the tunnel, however, the funds did not represent additional support to Victoria but rather a reallocation of existing contributions.

Contracting 
Utility relocations started in July 2016. 

A shortlist of preferred bidders for the project's main contract, the "tunnel and stations" public-private partnership, was released in August, along with further details of the MMRA's recommended engineering solutions. The bidders were three consortia composed of engineering, construction and finance companies: Continuum Victoria, consisting Acciona Infrastructure, Ferrovial Agroman, Honeywell, Downer Rail, and Plenary Group; Moving Melbourne Together, made up of Pacific Partnerships, CPB Contractors, Ghella, Salini Impregilo, Serco, and Macquarie Capital; and Cross Yarra Partnership, including Lendlease, John Holland, Bouygues, and Capella Capital. At the same time, the MMRA exercised its powers of compulsory acquisition to acquire City Square from the City of Melbourne, ahead of the original schedule.

Over the following months, further details of the construction process were made public, including long-term road closures and the precise location of construction sites. The revelations included the MMRA's concerns about the impact of tunneling on the structural integrity of CBD buildings, including Federation Square and St Paul's Cathedral.

In December 2017, the Government of Victoria selected the Cross Yarra Partnership to deliver the "tunnel and stations" public-private partnership.

Construction

Early works 
On 15 January 2017, works officially began on the project, with the partial closure of A'Beckett and Franklin streets in the CBD. Local media noted that the commencement marked almost precisely a decade since the project's inception. The news was followed by Infrastructure Australia releasing a positive assessment of the project's business case and urging the federal government to contribute funding to the tunnel.

Meanwhile, a case was lodged in the Supreme Court of Victoria by protest groups in an attempt to force the government and MMRA to reroute the project around the St Kilda Road precinct. Objections to the tunnel's construction were strengthened in February, when the federal government implemented an emergency heritage protection order for the precinct, preventing the MMRA from removing around 100 trees. The Victorian government decried the move as a political stunt, and insisted that the project would go ahead as planned. At the same time, the Liberal state opposition attempted to grant the City of Stonnington planning powers over the project with a motion in state parliament, in order to force the inclusion of a South Yarra station connection, but eventually withdrew when sufficient support could not be secured in the Legislative Council.

A major milestone was reached in mid-April when City Square was fenced off for the commencement of construction and staging works. A few days later, the government announced that bids for the major construction contract had been received from each of the consortia selected on the previous year's shortlist.

Cross Yarra Partnership, led by Lendlease, was named as the "preferred bidder" for the construction contract in July. The station designs presented by the consortium were released publicly, as well as details of connections to existing stations and streetscapes. Shortly afterwards, Bombardier was announced as the successful tenderer for the signalling and communication systems contract, and supplied plans to build signal control centres in Sunshine and Dandenong. The contract, including a rollout of high-capacity signalling (HCS) between Watergardens and Dandenong, was the first awarded in Australia for HCS implementation on existing rail lines.

At the end of August, the state government launched a public naming competition for the tunnel's five new stations, to replace the working names used since the project's genesis. The competition provoked a wide public response, with arguments over whether the names should reflect geographic location, cultural heritage, or tongue-in-cheek references such as Station McStationface. By the time the competition closed at the end of October, more than 50,000 submissions had been made, and the project had gained international attention with author George R. R. Martin commenting on suggestions that the stations be named after locations from his Game of Thrones series of books. However, the government emphasised that the competition was not to be judged by popular demand but by a panel of experts.

The selected names for the stations – North Melbourne, Parkville, State Library, Town Hall and Anzac – were announced in November of that year, with the government deciding on "common sense" options based on geographic location and ease of pronunciation. The existing North Melbourne station was to be renamed West Melbourne, but in early 2020 the government announced the existing station would not be renamed and the new station would revert to Arden, due to the potential for confusion and the need to relabel thousands of signalling assets.

Major construction 

The public profile of tunnel works increased through the end of 2017, with Lord Mayor Robert Doyle complaining that the City of Melbourne's pest controllers were being overwhelmed by rats disturbed by underground works. A public viewing platform was established at the City Square building site for the public to view the construction works. On 18 December, the state government announced that it had finalised its contract with Cross Yarra Partnership, with a value of some $6 billion. Opposition leader Matthew Guy immediately signalled his intention to bring the dispute over the tunnel's design to the 2018 state election, writing to CYP to indicate that he would seek to include a station at South Yarra should his party win government the following year.

Despite ongoing legal battles, tree felling in the St Kilda Road precinct began in February 2018, marking the commencement of significant construction in the area and the consortium's commitment to its design solution for the tunnel. Then, on 20 February, the state government released the tunnel contracts, and announced that the original completion date of 2026 had been brought forward to a new target of 2025. The announcement also included a response to the Opposition's intention to renegotiate the design, with Premier Daniel Andrews claiming it would mean a two-year delay to the overall project.

In April, further concerns about the tunnel's impact on buildings near its route emerged, with managers of the Victorian Comprehensive Cancer Centre in Parkville and the Manchester Unity Building in the CBD, along with the University of Melbourne, making submissions to the MMRA suggesting their properties were at serious risk of damage from construction and operation vibration. The authority responded that it would work with stakeholders to minimise impacts and ensure the project did not produce any adverse impacts. In the same month, the state government announced an upgrade of South Yarra station separate from the Metro Tunnel, in order to address the concerns about its lack of connectivity to the project.

Following a series of announcements of major rail projects prior to the state budget in May, the Melbourne Metro Rail Authority was renamed to Rail Projects Victoria (RPV) to reflect its involvement in projects outside the Metro Tunnel.

Final designs and concept images for the new stations were released in May 2018, using materials and features intended to reflect the character of the five station precincts. CYP, RPV and Minister for Public Transport Jacinta Allan expressed their hope that the designs would be accepted and integrated into the Melbourne landscape as new cultural icons following their completion. In June, the state government released modelling demonstrating the project's contribution to improved accessibility in the CBD, with travel time savings from virtually all parts of Greater Melbourne to the Parkville and St Kilda Road areas served by the Metro Tunnel.

Tunnelling 

In April, June, and July 2019, multiple rail lines in Melbourne's east were shut down for several weeks to allow construction of the tunnel entrances near Kensington and South Yarra. The first tunnel boring machine began to be assembled in North Melbourne in June 2019.

In February 2020, TBM Joan completed the first section of the tunnel from Arden to Kensington, travelling  and installing 4,200 curved concrete segments to create 700 rings lining the walls of the tunnel. Two months later, TBM Meg completed the accompanying tunnel, from Arden to Kensington. The third TBM, TBM Millie, began tunnelling to the South Yarra eastern tunnel entrance on 27 April 2020. As part of this process, it was lowered underground and assembled along with its counterpart TBM Alice. It tunnelled  to its destination. TBM Alice was released a month later, on 25 May 2020. TBM Joan began tunnelling again, this time towards Parkville, from Arden, on 25 May 2020. The release of TBM Meg towards Parkville meant that for the first time in the project, all four TBMs were tunnelling at the same time.

In May 2020, major traffic changes were put in place near Flinders Street Station in order to improve safety around large trucks entering acoustic sheds as a part of the project. Left turns from St Kilda Road to Flinders Street were removed, and the pedestrian crossing between St Paul's Cathedral and Federation Square was temporarily closed. The crossing will likely reopen in January 2022.

On 24 May 2021, after 20 months of work, it was announced all four TBMs had completed digging the twin  tunnels. Road-headers constructed 26 cross-passages along the tunnel in 2021. In mid-2022 crews began laying track in the tunnels.

Stations 

With tunnelling complete in mid-2021, the project's main focus moved on to station excavation, construction and fit-out. 

Road-headers broke through at the platform tunnels of Town Hall station in August 2021 as the major excavation phase on the two CBD stations neared completion. The "trinocular" construction method involved the construction of three overlapping tunnels with vaulted ceilings. This followed the completion of road-header excavation of the platform caverns at State Library in 2020.

Construction on Arden station's aboveground structure ramped up in late 2021, and consisted of a unique entrance of 15 large brick arches.

In 2022, acoustic sheds began to be dismantled at the Town Hall and Anzac station locations in order to allow construction of above-ground station structures.

Work began on a large wooden canopy at Anzac station in March 2022, which was constructed over the year using 190 cross-laminated timber panels. The canopy sits in a tram stop on St Kilda Road and will be Melbourne's first direct platform-to-platform tram/train interchange. In November 2022, the tram lines were rerouted over three weeks from their temporary route on the west side of the station to their permanent position on either side of the station entrance and interchange. The new tram interchange was opened in December 2022.

Project description
The project will consist of two  rail tunnels between South Kensington and South Yarra via the CBD with five new underground stations. A new cross-city metro style line will be created that runs from the north-west to the south-east of Melbourne, linking the Sunbury line with the Cranbourne and Pakenham lines. From 2029, the line will also run to Melbourne Airport via the planned Melbourne Airport Rail link. The new line, like similar projects the Elizabeth Line, Sydney Metro and the Paris RER, will be a hybrid commuter and rapid transit system, running a high-frequency rapid service in the inner city but also running trains to Melbourne's outer commuter suburbs.

The five new city stations are underground and will feature -long platforms, large concourses, and full-height platform-screen doors, a first for Melbourne. As part of the project, a new fleet of 65 High Capacity Metro Trains have been ordered to add further capacity to the network, the first of which entered service in 2020. These trains are the most advanced and highest capacity in Melbourne, and will run on the Metro Tunnel corridor as 7-car trains. They can be expanded to 10-car trains in the future with the new underground stations are long enough to accommodate the extended trains. A new stabling and maintenance depot was built in Pakenham East to house the new fleet.

Three of the new stations – Arden, Parkville, and Anzac – are cut-and-cover box designs, and involved digging down to build the station. With the exception of Arden, all of the stations feature multiple entrances. Anzac features a direct tram-train interchange with a large wooden canopy, while Arden will anchor a major urban renewal project in Melbourne's inner north. The two CBD stations will feature large transit-oriented development and retail.

As part of the project, a new third turnback platform will be built at West Footscray station. High capacity signalling in the form of moving-block communication-based signalling technology will be installed along the Metro Tunnel corridor and on the Airport branch to allow trains every two minutes. This is the first time high-capacity signalling has been installed on a legacy rail corridor in Australia. Station platforms were also extended along the corridor to allow for the new trains. Along with the Metro Tunnel project works, there are a number of associated infrastructure projects by the Victorian Government to upgrade the corridor, and the wider rail system in Melbourne, to rapid transit standards. The Sunbury Line Upgrade project, announced in the 2019 state budget, is upgrading the corridor from the tunnel to Sunbury and includes: platform extensions, accessibility upgrades, power and substation upgrades, new train stabling, and the removal of all level crossings on the Sunbury line to allow for High Capacity Metro Trains. The Cranbourne Line Upgrade is removing all remaining level crossings along the Cranbourne line, and has duplicated  of track to allow higher frequency services on the branch. An extension of the Cranbourne line to Clyde is also planned, though has not yet been funded by the government.
The Pakenham line will also be extended a short distance, with a new station built at Pakenham East near the new rail depot for the line. This new station is being delivered by the Level Crossing Removal Project.

Together these projects will establish a fully grade-separated corridor with high-capacity signalling capable of running frequent services through the new tunnel. According to the project's business case, it will allow an extra 39,000 passengers to travel in the peak period each day, with a further 41,000 extra passengers if 10-car trains are introduced.

Network changes 

The Metro Tunnel will create a new cross-city metro line when it connects the Sunbury, Cranbourne and Pakenham lines. As a result, these lines will be removed from the City Loop, and a major reorganisation of the network will occur. According to plans released by the Department of Transport and Planning in 2018, the Frankston line will be returned to the City Loop and cease through-routing with the Werribee and Williamstown lines. Instead, the Sandringham line will through-route with those lines via the Flinders Street Viaduct, and the Glen Waverley line will run direct to Flinders Street Station. The extra capacity will allow more peak services across the network, particularly for the Craigieburn and Upfield lines, which will no longer share a single loop track with the Sunbury line.

The 2016 project business case envisioned the tunnel including a newly electrified branch to Melton in the west. The business case planned for an initial 19 trains per hour during the peak running into the tunnel from the east and 18 from the west, increasing to 21 from the east and 23 from the west under the extended program after the Melton branch was added. Since then, this plan has been superseded by plans to run the Melbourne Airport rail link through the tunnel as a branch in the west.

In the 2022/23 state budget, money was allocated to train and employ 300 extra train drivers and station staff to allow Metro Trains Melbourne to operate the tunnel and the increased services across the network in 2025.

Tram network 

Relieving congestion on the busy Swanston Street tram corridor is a key goal of the Metro Tunnel project, and the opening of the tunnel will also see some major changes to the tram network in the central city.

Several tram connections and upgrades were funded as part of the project, including new track along Park Street in South Melbourne and on Flinders Street in the CBD, allowing trams to turn onto Flinders from the current tram terminus on Elizabeth Street. This will allow some trams routes to be directed away from Swanston Street towards the western end of the CBD, more evenly balancing services in the central city and reducing reliance on the Elizabeth and Flinders corridors. The 2016 business case envisioned routes 5 and 64 being rerouted to Docklands via Park and Spencer Streets, and Elizabeth Street trams continuing down Flinders Street to terminate outside the CBD at Melbourne Park and Jolimont.  

In 2017, new tram tracks were installed on Toorak Road West in South Yarra and trams were temporarily removed from Domain Road to allow construction of Anzac station, at the same time tram routes 8 and 55 were combined to form the new route 58.

Stations
The project involves construction of five new underground railway stations:

Arden

Arden station is to be located near the intersection of Arden and Laurens Streets in North Melbourne. It is planned to allow for urban renewal of the formerly industrial suburb, and is expected to serve some 25,000 residents once complete. The station entrance will be located on Laurens Street, between Queensberry and Arden streets to provide direct access to existing residential, retail and commercial areas east of Laurens Street. Provision will be made for an additional entrance at the western end of the station to service the Arden area as it develops in the future. Arden Station will be within walking distance of the North Melbourne Recreation Centre, Arden Street Oval and the existing route 57 tram.

Parkville

Parkville station is to be located on the intersection of Grattan Street and Royal Parade in Parkville, in proximity to the Royal Melbourne Hospital and Melbourne University. The station will relieve pressure on north–south tram routes and the congested 401 bus service between North Melbourne station and the university/hospital precinct. New tram stops are to be constructed as part of the project allowing for seamless tram and train interchanges. The station will service the busy hospital and research precinct, including the Victorian Comprehensive Cancer Centre. The station is expected to service 60,000 passengers each day in 2031.

State Library

 
State Library station is to be located on the intersection of Swanston and La Trobe Streets in the Melbourne CBD above the existing Melbourne Central station. This will allow for interchange opportunities between stations and existing lines and relieve pressure on Swanston Street tram routes. The station will service the northern end of the CBD, as well as the State Library of Victoria and RMIT University. The line will continue under Swanston Street running below the existing City Loop tunnels. The station will serve up to 40,000 passengers once complete.

Town Hall

Town Hall station is to be located on the corner of Swanston and Flinders Streets, with direct connections to Flinders Street station, adding further relief to tram services and servicing the southern end of the CBD. The station will be near St Paul's Cathedral, the Arts Precinct, Southbank and Federation Square and have exits on Collins Street. The line will proceed south running below the Yarra River and the Burnley and Domain tunnels. The station is expected to serve some 55,000 passengers during peak periods.

Anzac

Anzac station is to be located on St Kilda Road and Park Streets adjacent to the Domain Interchange, with interchange opportunities with existing St Kilda Road tram services. The station will service the Shrine of Remembrance, the busy St Kilda Road office precinct, the Royal Botanic Gardens and Melbourne Grammar School. The station is expected to serve approximately 14,500 passengers during peak periods.

Analysis and criticism

Network capacity
The primary stated aim of the project is to increase capacity within the inner core of the metropolitan network, as well as improving reliability and efficiency. It aims to accomplish this by creating a single, end-to-end metropolitan line between Sunshine in the west and Dandenong in the south-east, linking the existing Sunbury, Cranbourne and Pakenham lines and providing them with a dedicated city centre route. Because this re-routing removes services from two City Loop tunnels, more capacity will theoretically be available for the Werribee, Williamstown, Craigieburn, Upfield, Frankston and Sandringham lines. According to official project estimates, the result is a total capacity increase of 39,000 passengers in the city centre for each peak period.

However, the need for a new tunnel to increase capacity has been subject to criticism that capacity on the existing network is under utilised or hamstrung by operational inefficiencies, since the project was originally proposed in Eddington's report. Paul Mees in 2008 noted that the claim the new tunnel would allow 40 extra trains per hour through the city should be compared to an increase of 56 trains per hour by increasing line capacity to 24 trains per hour per line (80% of the theoretical 30 trains per hour allowed by the current signalling system), reducing dwell times and other efficiencies such as terminating some trains at Flinders Street station rather than Southern Cross station. Mees also criticised the proposal for absorbing rail investment at the expense of extending the network at its periphery.

On the other hand, transport economist Chris Hale has argued that while the capacity increase offered by the tunnel is real and probably more significant than that offered by incremental upgrades to the existing network, the project is the product of poor planning processes in the Victorian transport bureaucracy and consequently reflects a "single-issue" approach to infrastructure which is inconsistent with contemporary best practice. Hale contends that the tunnel's route, which reinforces existing transport networks and focuses on the inner city as the single connection point of all transport, exemplifies outmoded thinking and, therefore, achieves its primary aims while failing to accomplish more extensive benefits for a similar cost.

Ultimately, the business case for the Metro Tunnel considered high-capacity signalling and other network upgrades as alternatives to the proposed route. It concluded that, when compared to the tunnel, upgrading to HCS would produce inferior outcomes because of its limited capacity benefits and its failure to integrate improvement of the existing network with service to new parts of the central city. Additionally, the business case noted that by making incremental upgrades to the rail system without substantially altering its structure, the opportunity for more reliable operations as a result of fully segregated lines would be lost.

Swanston Street tram services
With the proposed route expected to run directly under Swanston Street and towards the south-eastern suburbs, the project will provide much needed relief to existing and overcrowded tram services that run from St Kilda Road into the CBD. Currently, St Kilda Road is the busiest tram thoroughfare in the world, with up to 10 tram routes running into the CBD via Swanston Street. The Melbourne Metro is expected to relieve this pressure by allowing commuters to catch the train into the Domain Interchange and CBD from either the north-west or south-eastern suburbs, avoiding already congested tram routes. In particular, many of the existing tram routes that run through St Kilda Road terminate at Melbourne University, which will be more easily accessible from the nearby Parkville station when the Melbourne Metro is complete.

Concerns existed over expected disruption along the Swanston Street corridor, with former Premier Denis Napthine controversially describing the alignment of the tunnel as akin to the Berlin Wall, which would "tear the city in half for up to two years". However, changes to engineering and construction plans allowed for tunneling, rather than the 'cut and cover' method of construction, resulting in minimal disruption for trams, pedestrians and traders along Swanston Street during construction.

Further network expansion
In 2012, Public Transport Victoria, the body charged with planning and coordination of public transport services in Victoria, released the Metropolitan Network Development Plan. It emphasised the need for the project as a precursor for other heavy rail expansion projects, given current limitations on existing inner city infrastructure to cope with additional services running into the inner part of the network. In particular rail lines to Doncaster, Melbourne Airport and Rowville require additional inner core capacity to enable services to run on those lines into the CBD.

Jobs
The project is expected to employ up to 3,500 people during peak construction. The training program called MetroHub provides all training, recruitment and project inductions for people working on the Tunnel and Stations work package. 500 apprentices, trainees and engineering cadets are expected to be a part of this program.

South Yarra station
The project ruled out integration with major south-eastern hub South Yarra station, meaning it will be bypassed by trains using the new tunnel. Passengers from the city on the tunnel's Dandenong line will not be able to transfer to the Sandringham line at South Yarra, and passengers travelling towards the city on the Dandenong line will be required to change at Caulfield to pursue travel to South Yarra. Pressure from the State Opposition and the Greens to include the station in the tunnel's design went unheeded. The Melbourne Metro Rail Authority has defended the plan, saying the economic case for integration is poor, requiring the building of a new hub and the acquisition of 114 properties including part of The Jam Factory at a cost of an extra $1 billion; a business case estimate indicates a return of only 20c for every dollar spent on the station. Integration of South Yarra station into the project has been the subject of lobbying as a requirement for federal funding.

Cost and funding
A significant point of contention has been the relative cost of the project and the capacity of the State to afford up to $11 billion. The former Abbott Federal Government had specifically ruled out funding urban rail projects across the country, limiting funding options for the Melbourne Metro project and placed pressure on the State Government to fund the project with a mix of debt and private business investment. While funding allocated by the Abbott Government for the now-scrapped East West Link was specifically ruled out for use on urban rail projects in Melbourne, the former Turnbull government had removed this condition.

Federal funding options for the project were realised by the former Abbott Government's 'Asset Recycling Program', which matches 15% of the cost of any State Government asset that is sold to be used for infrastructure projects. The sale of the Port of Melbourne by the Andrews Government could provide additional funding to the Melbourne Metro project once sold, including an indirect contribution by the Federal Government.

See also
Melbourne Metro 2 – proposed successor project
Cross River Rail - similar project under construction in Brisbane
Sydney Metro - similar project under construction in Sydney
City Rail Link - similar project under construction in Auckland, New Zealand
Suburban Rail Loop - proposed orbital line of the rail network of Melbourne

References

External links
Project website
Railpage - Detailed analysis and commentary on the project

Proposed railway lines in Australia
Railway lines in Melbourne

Underground commuter rail
2025 in rail transport
Tunnels in Victoria (Australia)
Public transport routes in the City of Melbourne (LGA)